The 2010 Western Australian storms were a series of storms that travelled over southwestern Western Australia on 21 and 22 March 2010. One of the more intense storm cells passed directly over the capital city of Perth between 3:30pm and 5:00pm on Monday 22 March 2010. It is the costliest natural disaster in Western Australian history, with the damage bill estimated at $1.08 billion.

The storms brought extensive hail, strong winds and heavy rain, causing extensive damage to vehicles, property and trees, and flash flooding, as well as the first significant rainfall in Perth since 20 November 2009.
At the peak, around 158,000 homes in Perth, Mandurah and Bunbury lost electric power. Telephone lines were cut to thousands of homes until the next day, and the storms led to an estimated A$200 million worth of insurance claims within three days, with $70 million within the first 24 hours. It was identified as the most expensive natural disaster in Western Australia's history, and was declared a natural disaster by the Premier, Colin Barnett, allowing federal and state funds to be used for disaster relief.

Over half of this fell in just 10 minutes. This was the first significant rainfall since 20 November 2009; only  had fallen in the entire period. It was similar to storms which struck Melbourne on 6 March 2010.

Storm timeline
During the warmer summer months, low-level surface troughs normally cross over the west coast of Australia, which often leads to isolated thunderstorm development in inland Western Australia, only occasionally reaching the coast (such as on 20 December 2009, when a storm developed south of Perth and gave the city of Mandurah  of rain for the month). However, on 21 and 22 March 2010, high surface dew points and temperatures combined with a low to the west of WA caused rare northerly winds to occur. This meant any storms that formed would be pushed southwards instead of the normal easterly pattern.

21 March 2010

The township of Badgingarra (halfway between Perth and Geraldton) bore the brunt of storms on both days, receiving .

22 March 2010

Seven pole-top fires cut power to 1,200 homes across both cities.

A severe thunderstorm warning was later declared for the central west (around Geraldton), lower west (including the cities Perth and Mandurah), central Wheatbelt, Great Southern and southern Gascoyne regions of Western Australia at 9.45am. It was amended at 2.30pm to indicate the threat to Perth.

As predicted, storms began to develop in the Jurien Bay area around 2pm, bringing another  to an already sodden Badgingarra. Perth was next in line for the storms, which first hit the northern suburbs around the Cities of Joondalup and Wanneroo, where  fell in two hours at the suburb itself. Hailstones with diameters of 3–5 cm were reported around suburbs like Osborne Park, Nollamara and Craigie, while  hailstones were measured in the inner Perth suburb of Wembley.

By 4pm, the Perth storm had reached the southern suburbs and damaging wind gusts had been reported at the suburb of Jandakot (96 km/h). Jarrahdale, to the southeast of Perth, received  in half an hour, exceeding the conditions required for a 1 in 100-year flood in terms of a period from 15 to 30 minutes. However, the storm began to lessen in intensity and become larger, forming a multi-squall line as it moved further south. A second wave of storm activity developed behind the first set, delivering further falls to northern Perth. Around 4.30pm, a severe thunderstorm warning was issued for Mandurah and surrounding areas. However, the storm had begun to move further inland, resulting in no hail reported in Mandurah or Rockingham and 17.4/13.4 mm at Garden Island and Mandurah respectively while inland towns such as Dwellingup and Waroona received 30.2 and 26.8mm respectively.

Building damage

Around 12,000 individual insurance claims were made in the 24 hours after the storms. The damage zone was defined by a loop from Geraldton to Mandurah through Cue, Merredin and Katanning. A week after the storm, the damage bill was estimated to have reached A$650 million, and was still climbing, making it the most expensive catastrophe in Western Australian history.

Over 100 people were evacuated from apartments near Kings Park in central Perth after heavy rain cause a large mudslide.

Several high schools in Perth's northern suburbs did not open on 23 March due to extensive storm damage. According to the Education Department there was damage to about 70 per cent of classrooms at Ocean Reef High School. Shenton College, Mindarie Senior College, Duncraig Senior High School, Tuart College and Heathridge Primary School were also closed, as was Perth Modern School for students in years 8, 9 and 10.

Car damage 
Tens of thousands of cars were damaged by the hail. The cost of fixing the dented panels is high, so many of these damaged cars were written off by the insurance companies covering the damage.

The storm dropped a lot of large hail on both a major vehicle retail area Osborne Park damaging millions of dollars of new and used cars (both directly and indirectly when buildings were damaged) and on the Kwinana Freeway.

See also
Severe storms in Australia
2010 Victorian storms
Climate of Perth
Extreme weather

Footnotes

External links
"Severe Thunderstorms in Perth and southwest WA", Australian Bureau of Meteorology

Western Australian storms
Western Australian Storms, 2010
Western Australian Storms, 2010
Natural disasters in Australia
2010s in Perth, Western Australia